Coryphellina is a genus of sea slugs, aeolid nudibranchs, marine gastropod mollusks in the family Flabellinidae.

Species
The following species are within the genus Coryphellina:
 Coryphellina albomarginata (M. C. Miller, 1971)
 Coryphellina arveloi (Ortea & Espinosa, 1998)
 Coryphellina cerverai (Fischer, van der Velde & Roubos, 2007)
 Coryphellina delicata (Gosliner & Willan, 1991)
 Coryphellina exoptata (Gosliner & Willan, 1991)
 Coryphellina hamanni (Gosliner, 1994)
 Coryphellina indica (Bergh, 1902)
 Coryphellina lotos Korshunova, Martynov, Bakken, Evertsen, Fletcher, Mudianta, Saito, Lundin, Schrödl & Picton, 2017
 Coryphellina marcusorum (Gosliner & Kuzirian, 1990)
 Coryphellina poenicia (Burn, 1957)
 Coryphellina rubrolineata O'Donoghue, 1929
 Coryphellina westralis (Burn, 1964)

References

Flabellinidae
Gastropod genera